Sun Flightcraft (formally Pro-Design & Sun Flightcraft) is a former Austrian aircraft manufacturer based in Innsbruck, founded by Herbert Hofbauer. The company at one time specialized in the design and manufacture of powered parachutes in the form of ready-to-fly aircraft for the European Fédération Aéronautique Internationale microlight category.

Founded in the early 2000s as a division of Hofbauer GmbH, the company stopped production of its powered parachute design, the Sun Flightcraft Air-Chopper, in about 2008, although it still supplies parts for the design.

The Air-Chopper was noted for its innovative use of the contra-rotating Coax-P aircraft propeller design to eliminate torque effects.

The company continues as an aircraft importer for Airborne Windsports ultralight trikes from Australia as well as a dealer for the Aeropro Eurofox, B&F Fk9, B&F Fk14 Polaris, Evektor Eurostar, TL Ultralight TL-2000 Sting and the Flight Design CT series of aircraft designs, in addition to Rotax aircraft engines.

Aircraft

References

External links

Aircraft manufacturers of Austria
Ultralight aircraft
Homebuilt aircraft
Ultralight trikes
Powered parachutes